Račić may refer to:

 Račić (surname), a Slavic surname
 Račić, Bosnia and Herzegovina, a village near Bihać